Groß Flotow is a village and a former municipality in the Mecklenburgische Seenplatte district, in Mecklenburg-Vorpommern, Germany. Since 7 June 2009, it is part of the town Penzlin.

Villages in Mecklenburg-Western Pomerania